Enlightened is an American comedy-drama television series that premiered on HBO on October 10, 2011. The series was created by Mike White, who wrote every episode, and Laura Dern. As signaled by its tagline "About a woman on the verge of a nervous breakthrough", Enlightened follows the story of Amy Jellicoe (Dern), a self-destructive executive, who, after the implosion of her professional life and a subsequent philosophical awakening in rehabilitation, tries to get her life back together.

In 2012, Dern won the Golden Globe Award for Best Actress – Television Series Musical or Comedy for her role in the series. The show was nominated for the Golden Globe Award for Best Television Series – Musical or Comedy.

After the completion of two seasons, HBO canceled the show in March 2013, partly due to low ratings, despite critical acclaim.

Plot
Amy Jellicoe is a 40-year-old woman who returns home to Riverside, California, after a two-month stay at a holistic treatment facility, a result of having a mental breakdown at work after finding herself demoted, which was triggered by her self-destructive ways (including heavy drinking and an affair with her married boss who likely demoted her as a way to keep the affair a secret), which in turn was triggered by a miscarriage and a rather bitter divorce. Amy returns to her old life with a new cultivated approach and perspective, which includes daily meditation and exhorting the power of self-help and inner healing. Though Amy wants to be an "agent of change" in the world, the people who know her best are skeptical of her latest intentions. She moves in temporarily with her somewhat-estranged mother, Helen (Diane Ladd, Dern's real-life mother), and reconnects with her ex-husband Levi (Luke Wilson), who is struggling with his own demons and addictions.
 
While trying to heal Levi and mend her relationship with Helen, Amy also re-enters work at Abaddonn Industries. This is due in large part to the head HR representative Judy Harvey (Amy Hill) discovering that with her diagnosis with bipolar disorder Amy could possibly sue Abaddonn for discrimination on the basis of illness/medical condition. Once a buyer in the company's Health and Beauty department, Amy is rehired, but assigned to a demeaning position in data processing, a department run by the flaky Dougie (Timm Sharp). Amy views the transfer as an attempt to hasten her departure and keep her away from her former co-workers, including former assistant Krista (Sarah Burns), who now has Amy's old job, and Damon (Charles Esten), her former boss and ex-lover. However, while in this new position, Amy uncovers a range of corporate abuse and corruption occurring at Abaddonn, which ultimately fuels her quest to make a change in the lives of others, as well as validating her own change.

Cast

Main cast

 Laura Dern as Amy Jellicoe, an ambitious and idealistic yet naïve and socially awkward buyer at Abaddonn Industries. After a humiliating nervous breakdown at her workplace, she goes to rehab and returns to her company with a new mindset but also a much less significant job. She contemplates becoming a whistleblower against Abaddonn.
 Luke Wilson as Levi Callow, Amy's ex-husband. A former MLB player for the Los Angeles Angels who was eventually cut due to his drug problems. Though the two still share feelings for each other, their relationship struggles due to Levi's problems with substance abuse which along with a miscarriage Amy suffered was what led to their subsequent divorce.
 Diane Ladd as Helen Jellicoe, Amy's quiet and rather aloof yet protective mother with her own ghosts from the past. Amy lives at her house after returning from rehab.
 Sarah Burns as Krista Jacobs, Amy's former assistant who now has her old job. Though Amy considers her a friend, Krista tries to keep their relationship at a distance.
 Timm Sharp as Dougie Daniels, the obnoxious, socially oblivious VP of Cogentiva.
 Mike White as Tyler, a shy, lonely coworker and friend of Amy at her new job. He used to be an IT worker for Abaddonn but was demoted after he got in trouble for hacking into a female co-worker's computer.

Recurring cast
 Amy Hill as Judy Harvey, an HR representative at Abaddonn who encounters Amy when she returns to work from rehab. She is a lesbian in her personal life. 
 Charles Esten as Damon Manning, Amy's brash former boss and ex-lover.
 Bayne Gibby as Connie, a deeply religious, conservative coworker at Cogentiva.
 Jason Mantzoukas as Omar, a brusque coworker of Amy and Tyler who is a close associate of Dougie.
 Michaela Watkins as Janice, Krista's best friend. She feels competitive, condescending, and resentful toward Amy.
 Riki Lindhome as Harper, Krista's friend and Amy's former coworker. She has a rather bubbly personality and unlike Janice she is generally friendly around Amy.  
 Robin Wright as Sandy (Season 1), Amy's best friend from rehab in Hawaii.
 Molly Shannon as Eileen (Season 2), the shy assistant to the CEO of Abaddonn Industries. She eventually dates Tyler.
 Dermot Mulroney as Jeff Flender (Season 2), a confident reporter from the Los Angeles Times who develops a casual relationship with Amy.
 James Rebhorn as Charles Szidon (Season 2), the mysterious CEO of Abaddonn Industries.

Production
The series appeared on HBO's development slate in August 2009 with Laura Dern set to star as the lead, Amy Jellicoe. On September 9, 2009, HBO placed a pilot order. Mike White wrote and directed the pilot, as well as co-starring in the series as Tyler. The series is executive produced by White and Dern and co-executive produced by Miguel Arteta and Edward Saxon. David Bernad and Jason Weinberg are producers for the series.

Casting announcements began in November 2009, with Sarah Burns cast as Krista Jacobs, Amy's workplace friend. Diane Ladd, Luke Wilson and Amy Hill then joined the series, with Ladd (who is Laura Dern's mother) playing Helen Jellicoe, Amy's mother. Luke Wilson is cast in the role of Levi, Amy's ex-husband and Amy Hill plays Judy, the head of human resources at Amy's workplace. Mos Def was cast in the role of Dougie, Amy's boss; however, he subsequently withdrew from consideration due to a dispute regarding the deal, and the role was recast with Timm Sharp.

On April 10, 2010, HBO picked the pilot up to series, with a ten episode order. The series premiered on October 10, 2011. On December 20, 2011, HBO announced they renewed the series for a second season.

Episodes

Season 1 (2011)

Season 2 (2013)

Reception

Critical response
In its first season, the critical reaction to Enlightened  was largely positive, scoring 74 out of 100 on Metacritic, indicating "Generally favorable reviews", based on 22 reviews. On Rotten Tomatoes, the first season has a 79% approval rating with an average rating of 7.5/10 based on 29 reviews, with a critics consensus of, "Enlightened is an outstanding and brave show, exemplifying how a television series can successfully present different elements of the human psyche." Times James Poniewozik wrote a piece titled "Enlightened: The Best New Show No One But You, If You Are Bothering to Read This Post, Is Watching". In it he writes that: "Enlightened, I guess, is the Velvet Underground of this TV season: that handful of people who are into the show are really into it. So here's one more effort to get you to consider watching this weird, perceptive show. And when I say 'you,' I'm talking about that guy over there. If you've read this far, I assume that you already watch it." In Entertainment Weeklys Melissa Maerz piece "Contrarian Corner: Why 'Enlightened' is the best show nobody's watching" she writes about the state of television and where Enlightened fits in: "There's a general feeling among cable TV fans that television needs to be dark in order to be taken seriously. And I get that. Most of my all-time favorite shows are about meth dealers and undertakers and stylishly dressed alcoholics. So there's something pretty brave about a show that's not cynical or sarcastic or defeatist, one that's not set on a street corner in Baltimore or inside Al Qaeda's torture barracks, and still manages to be absolutely heartbreaking. HBO's Enlightened is the most genuinely moving TV show that's debuted this fall. And none of the characters get cancer." The show appeared on several "best of" lists at the end of 2011, with some critics citing its ninth episode, "Consider Helen", as a standout.

The second season received higher acclaim than the first, with the season receiving a Metacritic score of 95 out of 100, based on 7 reviews. On Rotten Tomatoes, the second season has a 96% approval rating with an average rating of 9.2/10 based on 23 reviews, with a critics consensus of, "Enlightened is a must-see, continuing to show Amy Jellicoe as an empathetic, uneasy character who inspires to live positively." Michelle Dean of The Nation demands "everybody should be watching HBO's Enlightened" writing that it "is one of the few strokes of real, original storytelling left in prestige television right now." Hank Stuever of The Washington Post in his review of the second season says "This HBO exercise in exquisite portraiture (I still won't call it a comedy) returns Sunday night, and it is the most hauntingly nuanced and carefully written show currently on TV." Maureen Ryan of The Huffington Post wrote in her review, "The show's must-see second season is one of the best stories I've experienced in a long time (HBO sent all eight Season 2 episodes for review). And -- appropriately for a show about a woman who wants to live a more vivid and connected life -- it is an experience."

With continuing low ratings, creator Mike White in an interview spoke about the show's uncertain fate, in turn sparking a circle of critics to publish pieces on the show, pleading for more awareness and raving about its tremendous quality. In The A.V. Clubs review, they called Enlightened "TV's best show right now—and it needs more viewers. Jane Hu of Salon.com writes in her piece titled "HBO, please renew "Enlightened"!": "No matter when the tidal wave hits, we'll have had two perfect seasons. Meanwhile, I'm still holding out hope." Maureen Ryan of The Huffington Post published her own list of reasons for renewal, titled: 'Enlightened' Renewal: 8 Reasons HBO Must Bring Back This Show.

Upon reviewing the season 2 finale, a longtime champion of the show, Times James Poniewozik touched on the renewal prospects, writing: "And in Enlightened, whether it planned things this way, HBO has the best thing TV is doing right now—a show no other network would probably make, telling a story that the movies couldn't tell, not at such length and depth. Without HBO, this story would not exist, and HBO is a company in the without-us-nothing business. In other words, HBO doesn't owe it to us to keep Enlightened on the air; HBO owes it to itself. That's what you get when you bring something amazing into this beautiful, upsetting world."

Awards and nominations
For the 69th Golden Globe Awards, Laura Dern won for Best Actress – Television Series Musical or Comedy, while the series received a nomination for Best Television Series – Musical or Comedy. Dern also received a nomination for Best Actress in a Series, Comedy or Musical for the 17th Satellite Awards. For the 65th Primetime Emmy Awards, Dern was nominated for Outstanding Lead Actress in a Comedy Series, and Molly Shannon was nominated for Outstanding Guest Actress in a Comedy Series.

Ratings

Cancellation
Despite the critical acclaim, on March 19, 2013, HBO confirmed that the show would not return for a third season.

Plans for season three

As envisioned by creators Mike White and Laura Dern, Enlightened was to span as a trilogy, "all having a very different moral compass and theme, it kind of being a trilogy of falling apart and then getting it back together." Mike White detailed plans for the story should Enlightened have continued. These include:

 A focus on Amy's family and plans on bringing in her estranged sister Bethany (mentioned briefly in the Pilot and by Helen in "Consider Helen"), who has a child.
 The fallout from the exposé. "Creatively, there's a lot more story to tell about the idea of Amy being recognized, the wish fulfillment and what comes with it."
 Abaddonn Industries CEO Charles Szidon would make good on his threat to sue her. As Mike White puts it: "The whole thing is going to be the lawsuit. Abaddonn is going to sue Amy, and she's going to sue them. I think it'll be fun to do the send-up of the legal world in the way we did with the corporate stuff", White said. There will be depositions and testimony and character witnesses – and Amy's going to need her flak jacket. "It's going to be all the people we've introduced taking a position, and Amy's going to get a sense of what everyone really thinks of her."

In July 2021, White told The New Yorker that HBO has expressed interest over the last two or three years in "a one-off short season or a movie that wraps everything up." While White said he wouldn't rule it out, he noted that "right now, that doesn't feel like a bold decision" because "it would feel like it was pandering to the zeitgeist."

International distribution
In Canada, the series was simulcast on HBO Canada and debuted on October 10, 2011. In the United Kingdom, the series was broadcast on Sky Atlantic. The first season premiered on December 6, 2011, and the second season on September 26, 2014.

Home media releases

References

External links

2010s American comedy-drama television series
2011 American television series debuts
2013 American television series endings
English-language television shows
HBO original programming
Television series created by Mike White
Television shows set in Los Angeles